Eupithecia undulataria is a moth in the family Geometridae. It is found in Libya.

References

Moths described in 1934
undulataria
Moths of Africa